Das Fürlines from New York City, United States, were an influential, all-female "punk-polka" band in the mid-1980s, renowned for their rousing performances.

History
Das Fürlines appeared on the US TV shows Entertainment Tonight and Andy Warhol's 15 Minutes in 1985, and released their debut album Das Fürlines Go Hog Wild on their own label, Palooka Records. Their next album, Lost in the Translation (1986), was a lot more contextual than Go Hog Wild. In 1988, they released a concept album, The Angry Years, which was inspired by the self-help book Women Who Love Too Much. They split up acrimoniously in 1988 after a spate of betrayal and infighting during a tour. They released the four-CD compilation Bratwurst, Bierhalls, and Bustiers: The Box Set, which contained various outtakes, B-sides, and rarities. They reformed in 1996 to perform a few benefit concerts to raise money for lead singer Wendy Wild's medical bills. She died of cancer in 1996.

Members
Wendy Wild – vocals, banjo, guitar
Holly Hemlock – guitar, vocals
Deb O'Nair – keyboards, vocals, accordion 
Liz Luv – bass guitar 
Rachel Schnitzel – drums,

Albums
Das Fürlines Go Hog Wild (1985, Palooka Records)
Lost in the Translation (1986, Palooka Records)
Das Fürlines Live at Paddles (1987, Palooka Records)
Bratwurst, Bierhalls, and Bustiers: The Box Set (1992, Palooka Records)

References

Further reading
The Rolling Stone Encyclopedia of Rock & Roll – 3rd Edition

Musical groups from New York City
Musical groups established in 1985
1985 establishments in New York City